Anushka Shahaney (Anushqa) is an Indian singer and songwriter who has written and sung "Lost Without You" (written also) and "Stay a Little Longer with Me" in the film Half Girlfriend, both of the songs were picturised on Shraddha Kapoor and gained popularity. in Half Girlfriend (2017).

Early life
Anushka Shahaney is trained in Western classical music from Trinity College, London and is training in Indian classical singing.

Career
Shahaney hails from Mumbai. She participated in the first season of the show ‘The Stage’ and made it to the final. She received praises by the panel of judges. Later, she was given a chance by director Mohit Suri for his film Half Girlfriend. Both the songs ‘Stay A Little Longer’ and ‘Lost Without You’ from ‘Half Girlfriend’ have done very well. Mohit Suri praised her quoting, "I look forward to work with her again soon. She's constantly evolving as an artist and I think she has a very promising career ahead of her".

Filmography

Playback singer

Awards

References

Indian women songwriters
Indian lyricists
Bollywood playback singers
Indian women playback singers
Living people
Year of birth missing (living people)